The Consortium for Computing Sciences in Colleges (CCSC) is a nonprofit organization divided into ten regions that roughly match geographical areas in the United States. The purpose of the consortium is to: promote, support and improve computing curricula in colleges and universities; encompass regional constituencies devoted to this purpose; and promote a national liaison among local, regional and national organizations devoted to this purpose. Predominantly these colleges and universities are oriented toward teaching, rather than research.

Regions
CCSC regions include:

 Central Plains
 Eastern 
 Midsouth 
 Midwest 
 Northeastern 
 Northwestern 
 Rocky Mountain 
 South Central 
 Southeastern 
 Southwestern

Conferences
Conferences are typically held annually by region, and include presentation of peer-reviewed papers, as well as student papers, posters, and programming contests, workshops, and special sessions for innovative assignments and approaches in the area of computer science technology and education.

Journal
CCSC publishes the Journal of Computing Sciences in Colleges, containing the proceedings of each annual regional conference. The journal is distributed to approximately 600 faculty members from 350 colleges and universities.

See also
Association for Computing Machinery (ACM)
ACM Special Interest Group on Computer Science Education (SIGCSE)
Computer Science
Google for Education
National Center for Women & Information Technology
Upsilon Pi Epsilon

References

External links

Computer science education
Information technology organizations based in North America
Organizations established in 1986
1986 establishments in the United States